Lev Isaakovich Lemke (25 August 1931 – 4 August 1996, Saint Petersburg) was a Soviet and Russian actor, awarded the title Meritorious Artist of Russia.

Lemke finished his education in the Theatre School of Dnipropetrovsk in 1959, then worked in the New Moscow Theatre of Miniatures. In 1962 had started acting in the Leningrad Comedy Theatre and soon become the best actor there.

Filmography
 1994 - Sled chornoy ryby
 1991 - Skandalnoe proishestvie
 1991 - Dzhoker
 1991 - Genius (Гений) as Prof. Nathanson
 1991 - Rogonosets
 1990 - Vrag naroda - Bukharin, aka Public Enemy Bukharin - Trotsky
 1990 - Bluzhdayushie zvezdy - Sholom-Meer Muravchik
 1990 - Anekdoty
 1988 - Esperansa
 1986 - Levsha, aka The Left-Hander (based on Nikolai Leskov's book)
 1986 - Mikhailo Lomonosov (the third part: Vo slavu Otechestva)
 1986 - Krasnaya strela
 1985 - Podvig Odessy
 1985 - V. Davydov i Goliaf
 1984 - Aplodismenty, aplodismenty..., aka Applause, Applause...
 1984 - Po shyuchiemu veleniyu
 1981 - Opasnyj vozrast
 1980 - Leningradtsy, deti moi...
 1980 - Zhizn i priklyucheniya chetyrekh druzei - voices of animals
 1979 - Troe v lodke ne schitaya sobaki
 1978 - Zakhudaloe korolevstvo
 1977 - Vtoraya popytka Viktora Krokhina, aka The Second Attempt of Viktor Krokhin
 1977 - Zolotaya mina
 1975 - Mark Tven protiv, aka Mark Twain Against
 1975 - Polkovnik v otstavke
 1974 - Tsarevich Prosha
 1974 - Blokada, aka Blockade
 1974 - Agoniya aka Agony, aka Agony: The Life and Death of Rasputin
 1973 - Slomannaya podkova
 1973 - Novye priklyucheniya Donni i Mikki
 1972 - Poslednie dni Pompei
 1972 - Dvenadtsat mesyatsev - the eastern ambassador
 1971 - Krasnyj diplomat: stranitsy zhizni Leonida Krasina
 1971 - Shutite?
 1970 - Karnaval
 1970 - Obratnoj dorogi net
 1968 - An Old, Old Tale
 1967 - Segodnya - novyj attraktsion
 1967 - Dva bileta na dnevnoj seans, aka Two Tickets for a Daytime Picture Show
 1966 - Segodnya - novyj attraktsion
 1965 - Gorod masterov, aka The City of Masters - duke de Malicorne
 1965 - Strah i otchayanie v Tretyej imperii (based on Bertolt Brecht's play)
 1964 - Poezd miloserdiya
 1963 - Krepostnaya aktrisa
 1962 - Cheryomushki

References

External links
 

1931 births
1996 deaths
Russian male actors
20th-century Russian male actors
Soviet male voice actors
Soviet male actors
Burials at Serafimovskoe Cemetery